Brendan Evans and Chris Haggard were the defending champions, but they chose to not defend their title.
Austrian pair Martin Fischer and Philipp Oswald won in the final 7–5, 6–3, against Jonathan Marray and Aisam-ul-Haq Qureshi.

Seeds

Draw

Draw

References
 Doubles Draw

Kobstaedernes ATP Challenger - Doubles